Rich Moore (May 10, 1963) is an American film and television animation director, screenwriter and voice actor. He has directed the films Wreck-It Ralph (2012) and co-directed Zootopia (2016) and Ralph Breaks the Internet (2018) for Walt Disney Animation Studios. In addition, he has also worked on the animated television series The Simpsons, The Critic and Futurama. He is a two-time Emmy Award winner, a three-time Annie Award winner and an Academy Award winner.

Early life
Moore was born and raised in Oxnard, California. He studied film and video at the California Institute of the Arts, graduating with a Bachelor of Fine Arts degree in 1987. While there, he narrated Jim Reardon's 1986 student film Bring Me the Head of Charlie Brown. Included in his CalArts class were famous filmmakers such as Andrew Stanton, Brenda Chapman, and Jim Reardon.

Career

Television
After graduating from CalArts, Moore worked for Ralph Bakshi on CBS's Mighty Mouse: The New Adventures, co-writing all 13 season 1 episodes in 1987. Moore was one of the original three directors of The Simpsons, directing 17 episodes in the first 5 seasons from 1990 to 1993, including the episodes: "Flaming Moe's", "Itchy and Scratchy: The Movie", and "Marge vs. the Monorail". He won a 1991 Primetime Emmy Award for Outstanding Animated Program for The Simpsons: Homer vs. Lisa and the 8th Commandment, and later return as one of the sequence directors on The Simpsons Movie in 2007.

In 1994, Moore became a producer and supervising director for the animated series The Critic. He then oversaw the creative development and production of Futurama as the show's supervising director. He also directed several episodes of the animated series from 1999 to 2001, including the classic "Roswell That Ends Well", for which he won the Emmy Award for Outstanding Animated Program.

Moore's other television animation directing credits include Comedy Central's Drawn Together and "Spy vs. Spy" for MADtv. He served as supervising director on the 2009 animated Fox television series Sit Down, Shut Up.

Film
In 2004, Moore directed the Warner Bros. animated short film Duck Dodgers in Attack of the Drones. In 2008, he was invited by John Lasseter to join Walt Disney Animation Studios as a director, with the suggestion that he develop a story set in the world of video games. This would become the 2012 animated feature Wreck-It Ralph, Moore's feature directing debut, and a box office and critical success. Moore also supplied the voices for the film's characters Sour Bill and Zangief. Wreck-It Ralph won five Annie Awards, including Best Animated Feature and a Best Director award for Moore, and was nominated for the Academy Award for Best Animated Feature.

Moore's next animated feature film was Disney's Zootopia, which he directed alongside Byron Howard and co-director Jared Bush. The film, released on March 4, 2016, became the second highest-grossing animated feature film of 2016 with a worldwide box office gross of over $1.023 billion. The film also won the Academy Award for Best Animated Feature.

After Zootopia, Moore returned to direct Ralph Breaks the Internet, the sequel to Wreck-It Ralph, with fellow filmmaker Phil Johnston. The film was a financial success, outgrossing the original film with over $529.3 million worldwide. It was also nominated for multiple awards in the Best Animated Feature category, including the Academy Awards, Annie Awards, and Golden Globe Awards.

On April 8, 2019, Moore revealed that he had left Disney to join Sony Pictures Animation, where he would direct and produce original animated films for the studio, with the first being Vivo.

On March 16, 2022, Moore revealed that he has entered into an exclusive, multi-year overall deal with Skydance Animation.

Filmography

Films

Shorts 
{| class="wikitable"
|-
! Year
! Title
!Director
!Writer
!Other
! Role
! Notes
|-
| rowspan=3 | 1986
| Somewhere in the Arctic
| 
| 
| 
| Dohk
|
|-
| Bring Me the Head of Charlie Brown
| 
| 
| 
| Charlie Brown / Narration
| Aided and abetted by
|-
| Snookles
| 
| 
| 
| Dragon
| Special thanks
|-
| rowspan=2 | 1988
| Christmas in Tattertown
| 
| 
| 
|
| Character color designer
|-
| Technological Threat
| 
| 
| 
|
| Character animatorDesigner
|-
| 1989
| Hound Town
| 
| 
| 
|
| Animation directorStory artist
|-
| 1993
| Inland Empire (1993 film)|Inland Empire| 
| 
| 
| Harper Brackman
|
|-
| 2004
| Duck Dodgers in Attack of the Drones| 
| 
| 
|
|
|-
| 2009
| The Affliction| 
| 
| 
|
| Production assistant
|-
| 2013
| Garlan Hulse: Where Potential Lives| 
| 
| 
| Rich Moore
|
|}

 Other credits 

 Awards 
Feature Films

Emmy Awards
 1991 – Outstanding Animated Program (Programming Less Than One Hour) for The Simpsons ("Homer vs. Lisa and the 8th Commandment")
 2002 – Outstanding Animated Program (Programming Less Than One Hour) for Futurama ("Roswell That Ends Well")

Annie Awards
 2002 – Directing in an Animated Television Production for Futurama ("Roswell That Ends Well")
 2012 – Directing in an Animated Feature Production for Wreck-It Ralph 2016 – Directing in an Animated Feature Production for Zootopia (Shared with Byron Howard)
Academy Awards
 2012 – Nominated: Academy Award for Best Animated Feature for Wreck-It Ralph 2016 – Academy Award for Best Animated Feature for Zootopia 2018 – Nominated: Academy Award for Best Animated Feature for Ralph Breaks the Internet''

Television directing credits

The Simpsons 
"The Telltale Head" (season 1, episode 8, original air date: February 25, 1990)
"Homer's Night Out" (season 1, episode 10, March 25, 1990)
"Simpson and Delilah" (season 2, episode 2, October 18, 1990)
"Treehouse of Horror" (season 2, episode 3, October 25, 1990)
"Dead Putting Society" (season 2, episode 6, November 15, 1990)
"Homer vs. Lisa and the 8th Commandment" (season 2, episode 13, February 7, 1991)
"Lisa's Substitute" (season 2, episode 19, April 25, 1991)
"Stark Raving Dad" (season 3, episode 1, September 19, 1991)
"Bart the Murderer" (season 3, episode 4, October 10, 1991)
"Flaming Moe's" (season 3, episode 10, November 21, 1991)
"Lisa the Greek" (season 3, episode 14, January 23, 1992)
"Brother, Can You Spare Two Dimes?" (season 3, episode 24, August 27, 1992)
"A Streetcar Named Marge" (season 4, episode 2, October 1, 1992)
"Itchy & Scratchy: The Movie" (season 4, episode 6, November 3, 1992)
"Marge vs. the Monorail" (season 4, episode 12, January 14, 1993)
"The Front" (season 4, episode 19, April 15, 1993)
"Cape Feare" (season 5, episode 2, October 7, 1993)

The Critic 
"Pilot" (season 1, episode 1, January 26, 1994)
"Lady Hawke" (season 2, episode 3, March 19, 1995)
"I Can't Believe It's a Clip Show" (season 2, episode 10, May 21, 1995)

Futurama 
"Space Pilot 3000" (co-directed with Gregg Vanzo) (season 1, episode 1, March 28, 1999)
"Hell Is Other Robots" (season 1, episode 9, May 18, 1999)
"A Clone of My Own" (season 2, episode 15, April 9, 2000)
"Anthology of Interest I" (co-directed with Chris Louden) (season 2, episode 20, May 21, 2000)
"Roswell That Ends Well" (season 4, episode 1, December 9, 2001)

Baby Blues 
 "Bizzy Moves In" (season 1, episode 2, July 28, 2000)

Drawn Together 
"Clum Babies" (season 2, episode 5, November 16, 2005)
"Alzheimer's That Ends Well" (season 2, episode 14, March 8, 2006)

References

External links

 

Living people
People from Oxnard, California
American animated film directors
American television directors
Primetime Emmy Award winners
Walt Disney Animation Studios people
Sony Pictures Animation people
Skydance Media people
Annie Award winners
California Institute of the Arts alumni
American male voice actors
Animation screenwriters
Directors of Best Animated Feature Academy Award winners
Film directors from California
Male actors from California
Screenwriters from California
Year of birth missing (living people)